Vannakkan Sāthanār (Tamil: வண்ணக்கஞ் சாத்தனார்) was a poet of the Sangam period to whom verse 43 of the Tiruvalluva Maalai.

Biography
Vannakkan Saathanar was a poet from the late Sangam period that corresponds between 1st century BCE and 2nd century CE. He was known for his erudition in Sanskrit. He also did a comparative study on Tamil and Sanskrit.

View on Valluvar and the Kural
Vannakkan Saathanar has authored verse 43 of the Tiruvalluva Maalai. He opines about Valluvar and the Kural text thus:

See also

 Sangam literature
 List of Sangam poets
 Tiruvalluva Maalai

Citations

References

 
 

Tamil philosophy
Tamil poets
Sangam poets
Tiruvalluva Maalai contributors